The following lists events that happened during 1987 in Chile.

Incumbents
Dictator: Augusto Pinochet

Events

October
10–25 October – 1987 FIFA World Youth Championship

Births
23 February – Hugo Díaz (footballer, born 1987)
30 May – Rodrigo Paillaqueo
29 June – Jena Lee
24 July – José Luis Muñoz
1 August – Diego Paulsen
3 August – Daniel Zamudio
5 November – Alejandro Fuentes

Deaths
27 July – Hernán Olguín

References 

 
Years of the 20th century in Chile
Chile